Baird Independent School District is a public school district based in Baird, Texas (USA). In addition to Baird, the district also serves the town of Putnam. The district operates one high school, Baird High School.

Finances
As of the 2010–2011 school year, the appraised valuation of property in the district was $111,051,000. The maintenance tax rate was $0.117 and the bond tax rate was $0.007 per $100 of appraised valuation.

Academic achievement
In 2011, the school district was rated "academically acceptable" by the Texas Education Agency.  Forty-nine percent of districts in Texas in 2011 received the same rating. No state accountability ratings will be given to districts in 2012. A school district in Texas can receive one of four possible rankings from the Texas Education Agency: Exemplary (the highest possible ranking), Recognized, Academically Acceptable, and Academically Unacceptable (the lowest possible ranking).

Historical district TEA accountability ratings
2011: Academically Acceptable
2010: Recognized
2009: Recognized
2008: Recognized
2007: Academically Acceptable
2006: Recognized
2005: Academically Acceptable
2004: Academically Acceptable

Schools
As of the 2011–2012 school year, Baird ISD had three schools.
Baird High School (Grades 9-12)
Baird Middle (Grades 6-8)
Baird Elementary (Grades PK-5)

Special programs

Athletics
Baird High School participates in the boys sports of baseball, basketball, and football. The school participates in the girls sports of basketball and softball. For the 2012 through 2014 school years, Baird High School will play football in UIL Class 1A Division II.

See also

List of school districts in Texas
List of high schools in Texas

References

External links

School districts in Callahan County, Texas